Contemporary Philosophy of Thought: Truth, World, Content is a book by British philosopher Michael Luntley, published in 1999 by Blackwell. The book provides an introduction to contemporary philosophy and the issues and concepts of it. The book received reviews from journals including Mind and Philosophical Books, along with being widely cited in its field.

References 

1999 non-fiction books
Philosophy books